Nathan Daniel Shepherd (born October 9, 1993) is a Canadian professional American football defensive tackle for the New Orleans Saints of the National Football League (NFL). He played college football at Simon Fraser and Fort Hays State.

Early life
Shepherd grew up in Ajax, Ontario, where he played youth football with the Ajax/Pickering Dolphins Football Club.

College career
At Simon Fraser University, Shepherd redshirted his first year and was able to start every game his second year as a defensive end. He left the university after a total of two years, as he was no longer able to pay tuition. After leaving Simon Fraser, Shepherd spent time in various jobs including working in a plant nursery, electrical construction, and a cardboard box factory. Fort Hays State University later reached out to Shepherd, and Shepherd was able to pay his first semester of tuition before being put on athletic scholarship. After his 2017 season, Shepherd was named the MIAA Defensive Player of the Year. He was also invited to play in the 2018 Senior Bowl.

Professional career
On November 20, 2017, it was announced that Shepherd had accepted his invitation to play in the 2018 Senior Bowl. He became the first player from Fort Hays State to receive an invitation to the Senior Bowl. Shepherd was productive during Senior Bowl practices and had his draft stock rise significantly after displaying speed, power, and technique while going up against the top offensive linemen in the nation. Shepherd unfortunately suffered a broken hand during Senior Bowl practice and was unable to participate in the official game.

Shepherd attended the NFL Scouting Combine in Indianapolis and completed the majority of combine drills, but opted to skip the bench press due to his fractured hand. His performance continued to raise his draft stock and garnered him attention throughout the draft process. On March 12, 2018, Shepherd held a pro day at Fort Hays State, but opted to stand on his combine numbers and only performed positional drills for the scouts and team representatives from 16 NFL teams that attended. Shepherd attended ten private meetings with team and also performed at private workouts for multiple teams, that included the Dallas Cowboys, Arizona Cardinals, Atlanta Falcons, and Houston Texans. At the conclusion of the pre-draft process, Shepherd was projected to be a second or third round pick by NFL draft experts and scouts. He was ranked as the sixth best defensive tackle prospect in the draft by DraftScout.com and Scouts Inc.

New York Jets
The New York Jets selected Shepherd in the third round (72nd overall) in the 2018 NFL Draft. Shepherd was the sixth defensive tackle drafted in 2018 and became only the third player to be drafted in the history of Fort Hays State. He became the first player to be drafted from Fort Hays State since Frankie Neal was drafted by the Green Bay Packers in the third round (71st overall) of the 1987 NFL Draft.

On May 14, 2018, the New York Jets signed Shepherd to a four-year, $3.87 million contract that includes a signing bonus of $987,724.

Shepherd was suspended for six games for violating the NFL's performance-enhancing drugs policy on September 10, 2019. It was revealed that Shepherd underwent a sports hernia surgery in the off-season plus battling a shoulder issue and a herniated disc in his back. Shepherd confessed about using the PEDs in an effort to speed up his recovery, which eventually led to his suspension. He was reinstated from suspension on October 29, 2019, and was activated on November 1, 2019.

On March 16, 2022, Shepherd signed a one-year contract extension with the Jets.

New Orleans Saints
On March 17, 2023, Shepherd signed a three-year, $15 million contract with the New Orleans Saints.

References

External links
Fort Hays State bio
New York Jets bio

1993 births
Living people
People from Ajax, Ontario
Gridiron football people from Ontario
Black Canadian players of American football
American football defensive tackles
Simon Fraser Clan football players
Fort Hays State Tigers football players
New York Jets players
New Orleans Saints players